The Crimson Campaign is the second book in The Powder Mage trilogy written by American author Brian McClellan. It was first published by Orbit Books on May 6, 2014 and is the sequel to Promise of Blood (2013). The third and last book, titled The Autumn Republic, was released on February 10, 2015.  The audiobook was narrated by Christian Rodska.

Plot 
Field Marshal Tamas has committed a brutal coup against Adro's monarchy and is now in open war with the Kez. Cut off behind enemy lines with only a fraction of his army, he must lead his men through northern Kez to safety, meanwhile defending his country against the angry god Kresimir, who wants the head of the man who shot him in the eye.

Taniel Two-Shot, presuming his father to be dead, finds himself the last line of defense against the devastating army of the most powerful god.

Reception
Review of The Crimson Campaign were generally favorable. Publishers Weekly referred to the book as a "swirling sequel" and Staffer’s Book Review stated it was "just great fun." Kirkus Reviews gave a more reserved appraisal stating the "book is less relentlessly inventive than the inaugural volume but still impressively distinctive and pungent…".

Richard Bray of Fantasy-Faction wrote in his review, "In all, The Crimson Campaign is the rare middle book of a trilogy that actually kicks its pace up a notch. It’s an amazing work, and has the series well-situated for an outstanding finale in The Autumn Republic due out next year.

Books in the series 
 Promise of Blood (2013)
 The Crimson Campaign (2014)
 The Autumn Republic (2015)

External links 
 Official website of Brian McClellan

References 

2014 American novels
American fantasy novels
Orbit Books books